Álvaro María Nadal Belda is a Spanish economist and politician. He has been a member of the Congress of Deputies since 2008. He was appointed Minister of Energy, Tourism and Digital Agenda on 4 November 2016. He left office on 7 June 2018 after the Government that he was part of lost the support of the Congress.

He has a twin brother named Alberto Nadal Belda who was Secretary of State of Budgets and Expenditures since 2016 to 2018.

Biography
Álvaro María Nadal Belda born in Madrid on 30 January 1970. He holds a degree in law, Economics and Business. He is a Commercial Technician and State Economist and he passed a Doctorate courses at Harvard University. He also held different administrative positions in the ministries of Economy, the Treasury and Industry.

Since 2004 is Secretary of Economy of the Popular Party and since 2011, Director-General of the Economic Office of the President of the Government. In 2008 he was elected Deputy of the Congress of Deputies.

In 2016, PM Mariano Rajoy appointed him as his new Minister of Energy, Tourism and Digital Agenda until 2018.

He speaks fluently English, French and German.

Coincidentally, he has the same degrees as his twin brother.

References 

1970 births
Living people
Industry ministers of Spain
Government ministers of Spain
Members of the 9th Congress of Deputies (Spain)
Members of the 10th Congress of Deputies (Spain)
Members of the 11th Congress of Deputies (Spain)
Members of the 12th Congress of Deputies (Spain)
Fulbright alumni